Greenville station is an Amtrak train station in Greenville, South Carolina, United States.

History
Opened in 1988, the modern red-brick Greenville station was built by Norfolk Southern Railway. It replaced the larger Southern Railway station, which had existed at the same location from 1905-1988.

Services
The facility is open between the hours of 4:00am-6:00am and 10:00pm-12:00am, which includes the waiting area. No ticket sales office nor baggage services are available at this station.

References

External links 

Greenville Amtrak Station & Norfolk Southern Freight Depot (USA Rail Guide -- Train Web)
Former Greenville Southern Railroad Depot (Dynamic Depot Maps image)

Transportation in Greenville, South Carolina
Amtrak stations in South Carolina
Railway stations in the United States opened in 1988
Buildings and structures in Greenville, South Carolina